Jamie Alexander Richards (born 24 June 1994) is an English professional footballer who plays as a defender for Tiverton Town.

Born in Southend-on-Sea, he progressed through Plymouth Argyle's youth system to make his Football League debut in 2013.

Career
Originally from Southend-on-Sea in Essex, Richards was a youth player at Southend United before moving to Newton Abbot in Devon. He joined Plymouth Argyle at the age of nine. Richards progressed through the club's centre of excellence and youth team to sign a three-year professional contract in July 2011. He made his senior debut in a Football League Trophy win against Aldershot Town in October 2012, and made his first appearance in the Football League against AFC Wimbledon in February 2013. In March, Richards joined Weymouth on loan until the end of the season, and made his debut against Redditch United. Richards returned to Weymouth on loan until the end of the season in March 2014, and scored against Bashley in his first game.

In June 2014, Richards joined Northern Irish Premiership side Linfield on a seven-month loan deal, linking up with former Argyle forward Warren Feeney, who had just become manager of the Belfast-based club in May. In July, he made his Linfield and European debut against B36 Tórshavn in the 2014–15 UEFA Europa League first qualifying round first leg. Linfield won 2–1, with Richards playing the entire 90 minutes. The Blues drew 1–1 in the second leg to go through to the next round 3–2 on aggregate. In the second round, Richards again played the full 90 minutes of the first leg, as Linfield celebrated their 100th competitive European match by defeating Swedish Allsvenskan side AIK 1–0. However, Linfield ultimately lost the away leg 2–0 and were eliminated 2–1 on aggregate.

In December 2014, he was sent out on loan to Conference Premier side Dartford on a one-month loan deal.

In 2016, Richards joined Truro City, and later went on to be club captain.

In June 2022, Richards joined Tiverton Town.

Career statistics

References

External links

1994 births
Living people
Sportspeople from Southend-on-Sea
English footballers
Association football defenders
Plymouth Argyle F.C. players
Weymouth F.C. players
Linfield F.C. players
Dartford F.C. players
Torquay United F.C. players
Truro City F.C. players
Tiverton Town F.C. players
English Football League players
Southern Football League players
NIFL Premiership players